Swain, Swains or Swain's may refer to:

Places 
 Swain Islands, Antarctica
 Swain's Island (Newfoundland and Labrador), Canada
 Swains Island, an atoll in the Tokelau chain, American Samoa
 Swain County, North Carolina, United States
 Swains Lake, New Hampshire, United States

Other uses 
 Swain (surname)
 Swain (horse), a European Thoroughbred racehorse
 Swain School of Design, a former non-profit educational institution now part of the University of Massachusetts Dartmouth

See also 
 Sweyn, a Scandinavian given name